HD 165590 is a quintuple system dominated by the binary Algol variable star known as V772 Herculis.

System 
The primary star is an eclipsing binary ADS 11060A composed of G1 and K6 young main-sequence stars with strong starspot activity. A radio flare from the star V772 Her was detected in 2011. The period of the components of the primary, ADS 11060Aa and ADS 11060Ab, is 0.87950 days.

A main-sequence companion star ADS 11060B of spectral type G5 at a separation of 0.491 arcseconds, is orbiting the primary with a period of 20.08 years. 

Also, there is a suspected companion binary star ADS 11060C (Gaia EDR3 4576326312901650560) at a projected separation of 29 arcseconds (1200 AU) from ADS 11060AB. ADS 11060C is composed of K7 and M0 main-sequence stars, orbiting each other with a period of 25.7631 days without eclipses. The binary is a BY Draconis variable with the variable star designation V885 Herculis.

The planetary orbits in the habitable zones in the system ADS 11060AB are unstable due to the gravitational influence of the stellar companions.

References 

5
Hercules (constellation)
J18054972+2126453
BD+21 3302
088637
165590
G-type main-sequence stars
K-type main-sequence stars
M-type main-sequence stars
Algol variables
Herculi, V772
BY Draconis variables